Sultanah of Kedah is the title given to the consorts of the incumbent Sultan of the Malaysian State of Kedah. The title was introduced by Sultan Badlishah on 13 May 1943. Previous consorts of the Sultan of Kedah given no any official title. Sultanah is styled as Her Royal Highness (Malay:Kebawah Duli Yang Maha Mulia).

Like many spouses of heads of state, the Sultanah of Kedah has no stipulated role or duties in the Kedah State Constitution. However, she accompanies the Sultan of Kedah to official functions and state visits, as well as hosting visiting heads of state and their spouses.

List of Sultanahs

Living former Sultanahs
 Che Puan Besar Haminah (reigned, 21 November 2003 – 11 September 2017)

See also
 Sultanate of Kedah
 Yang Di-Pertuan Agong (King of Malaysia)
 Raja Permaisuri Agong (Queen of Malaysia)
 Merong Mahawangsa (Legendary King of Kedah)
 Sultana (title)
 Kedah royal consorts
 Sultans of Kedah

References